The 1902–03 FA Cup was the 32nd season of the world's oldest association football competition, the Football Association Challenge Cup (more usually known as the FA Cup). Bury won the competition for the second and (as of 2022) final time, beating Derby County 6–0 in the final at Crystal Palace. This scoreline stood as a record victory in an FA Cup final until Manchester City equalled it by beating Watford 6–0 on 18 May 2019.

Matches were scheduled to be played at the stadium of the team named first on the date specified for each round, which was always a Saturday. If scores were level after 90 minutes had been played, a replay would take place at the stadium of the second-named team later the same week. If the replayed match was drawn further replays would be held at neutral venues until a winner was determined. If scores were level after 90 minutes had been played in a replay, a 30-minute period of extra time would be played.

Calendar
The format of the FA Cup for the season had a preliminary round, five qualifying rounds, an intermediate round, three proper rounds, and the semi-finals and final.

Intermediate round

The Intermediate Round featured ten games, played between the ten winners of the fifth qualifying round, and ten teams given byes. First Division Middlesbrough, along with Bristol City, Preston North End, Woolwich Arsenal, Burnley and Lincoln City from the Second Division were entered automatically into this round, as were non-league Reading, Bristol Rovers, West Ham United and Millwall Athletic.

The other Second Division sides had to gain entry to this round through the earlier qualifying rounds. Burton United, Blackpool and Stockport County were entered at the first qualifying round, while the others, Burslem Port Vale, Chesterfield, Doncaster Rovers, Gainsborough Trinity, Leicester Fosse and Manchester United, were entered in the third qualifying round. Of these, only Manchester United, Glossop and Burton United reached the Intermediate Round. They were joined by seven other non-league sides.

The ten matches were played on 13 December 1902. Three matches went to replays, with one of these going to a second replay (held at Villa Park).

First round proper
The first round proper contained 16 ties between 32 teams. 17 of the 18 First Division sides were given a bye to this round, as were Manchester City and Small Heath from the Second Division, and Southern League teams  Southampton, Portsmouth, and Tottenham Hotspur. They joined the ten teams who won in the intermediate round.

The matches were played on Saturday, 7 February 1903. Four matches were drawn, with the replays taking place in the following midweek. One of these, the Notts County v Southampton match, went to a second replay, which Notts County won at Small Heath's St Andrew's ground.

Second round proper
The eight Second Round matches were played on Saturday, 21 February 1903. There was one replay, between Nottingham Forest and Stoke City, played in the following midweek.

Third round proper
The four Third Round matches were played on Saturday 7 March 1903. There were no replays.

Semi-finals
The semi-final matches were played at neutral venues on Saturday 21 March 1903. Bury and Derby County won and went on to meet each other in the final.

Final

The Final was contested by Bury and Derby County at Crystal Palace. Bury won 6–0, with goals from George Ross, Charlie Sagar, Joe Leeming (2), William Wood and Jack Plant. The scoreline was a record for the biggest winning margin in the FA Cup final until Manchester City equalled it in 2019.

Match details

See also
FA Cup Final

References
General
Official site; fixtures and results service at TheFA.com
1902-03 FA Cup at rsssf.com
1902-03 FA Cup at soccerbase.com

Specific

 
1902-03